The Saladin governorate election of 2009, was held on 31 January 2009 alongside elections for all other governorates outside Iraqi Kurdistan and Kirkuk Governorate.

Campaign 
The governor of Saladin, Hamad Hamood al-Qaysi, stood for the Iraqi National List of former Prime Minister Ayad Allawi. The INL also recruited local tribal leaders. The INL were successful in the elections because they had consistently opposed the de-Baathification policies of the Iraqi government, which had caused significant unemployment in the province.

The Reconciliation and Liberation Bloc's main slogan was "Get Out, Get Out Occupier".

Results 
Immediately after the election, the Iraqi National List and the Iraqi National Dialogue Front claimed victory in Saladin.

In March, the INDF said they would form an alliance with the State of Law Coalition.

|- style="background-color:#E9E9E9"
! style="text-align:left;vertical-align:top;" colspan=2 |Coalition !! Allied national parties !! Seats (2005) !! Seats (2009) !! Change !! Votes
|-
| style="background-color:#F47C20;" |
| style="text-align:left;" |Salahuddin Accordance Front || style="text-align:left;" |Iraqi Accord Front || – || 5 || 5 || 57,264
|-
| style="background-color:#098DCD;" |
| style="text-align:left;" |Iraqi National Accord || style="text-align:left;" |INL || 3 || 5 || 2 || 56,853
|-
|
| style="text-align:left;" |National Iraqi Gathering|| || 3 || 3 || – || 35,482
|-
| style="background-color:#00009F;" |
| style="text-align:left;" |Iraqi National Dialogue Front|| || – || 3 || 3 || 35,131
|-
|
| style="text-align:left;" |Iraqi Scholars and Intellectuals Group||  || – || 2 || 2 || 23,772
|-
| style="background-color:#00CCFF;" |
| style="text-align:left;" |Iraqi Turkmen Front || style="text-align:left;" |ITF || 5 || 2 || 3 || 19,013
|-
| style="background-color:#000000;" |
| style="text-align:left;" |Reconciliation and Liberation Bloc ||  || 6 || 2 || 4 || 18,743
|-
|
| style="text-align:left;" |Salahuddin National Front ||  || – || 2 || 2 || 18,079
|-
| style="background-color:#CCFF33;" |
| style="text-align:left;" |List of the Unified Democratic Coalition in Salah al-Din Governorate  Brotherly and Co-existence Coalition|| style="text-align:left;" |PUK, KDP || 8 || 2 || 6 || 17,651
|-
| style="background-color:#FF0000;" |
| style="text-align:left;" |State of Law Coalition|| style="text-align:left;" |Islamic Dawa Party || 3 || 2 || 1 || 14,422
|-
| style="background-color:#004179;" |
| style="text-align:left;" |Coalition for Iraqi National Unity|| || 5 || – || 5 ||
|-
|
| style="text-align:left;" |Unified List || || 4 || – || 4 ||
|-
|
| style="text-align:left;" |Gathering of Independents in Salah al-Din|| || 2 || – || 2 ||
|-
| style="background-color:#000000;" |
| style="text-align:left;" |National Al-Risaliya List|| style="text-align:left;" |Sadr || 2 || – || 2 ||
|-
| colspan=3 style="text-align:left;" |Total || 41 || 28 || 13 || 403,764
|-
|colspan=6|Sources: this article -
|}

References 

2009 Iraqi governorate elections